Thomas Brennan (born 2 July 2001) is a British speedway rider.

Career
In 2016, Brennan made a number of guest appearances at reserve for Eastbourne Eagles after he turned 15 and was eligible to ride in the National League. He made his debut for Eastbourne on his 15th birthday against Birmingham Brummies, however he crashed in his first ride and suffered a broken collarbone.

Brennan retained his spot for Eastbourne for the 2017 season. A good start to the season saw him move from reserve to number 1, before he moved to number 4 for the majority of the season. He scored his first paid maximum scoring 9+3 from 4 rides in the National League Knockout Cup Final against Mildenhall Fen Tigers. Brennan finished the season with an average of 7.21, making him the most improved rider in the National League in 2017, with an increase of 4.21 from his starting average of 3.00. He also helped Eastbourne win the Knockout Cup for the third successive season, beating Mildenhall in the final.

For the 2018 season he started in the number 3 position and scored his first full maximum and moved back to number 1 by the end of June. On 5 July, Brennan competed in the European U19 semi-final in Pardubice, scoring 11 points from his five rides finishing 5th and qualifying for the final. In the final at Varkaus he finished 9th overall with a total of 7 points. Brennan also made a guest appearnace in the SGB Premiership. Brennan helped Eastbourne win the National League and cup double, winning the playoff and Knockout Cup, defeating Mildenhall in both.

Brennan continued with Eastbourne despite their move up to the SGB Championship 2019 and this allowed Brennan to sign for the Cradley Heathens in the lower division as well.

In 2021, he became a world champion after Great Britain secured the 2021 Speedway of Nations (the world team title) and signed for the Belle Vue Aces. He returned to ride for Belle Vue in the SGB Premiership 2022, where he won the league title and for the Glasgow Tigers in the SGB Championship 2022. He finished runner-up to Dan Bewley in the 2022 British Speedway Championship and finished in 9th place during the World Under-21 Championship in the 2022 SGP2.

In 2023, he re-signed for Belle Vue for the SGB Premiership 2023 and for Glasgow for the SGB Championship 2023.

References

Living people
2001 births
British speedway riders
Belle Vue Aces riders
Cradley Heathens riders
Eastbourne Eagles riders
Glasgow Tigers riders